Anatoma australis, commonly known as the southern slit shell, is a species of minute sea snail, a marine gastropod mollusc or micromollusc in the family Anatomidae.

Description
The length of the shell reaches 3 mm.

Distribution
This marine species occurs off New South Wales, Australia and off Tasmania

References

 Iredale, T. & McMichael, D.F., 1962 . A reference list of the marine Mollusca of New South Wales. Mem. Aust. Mus., 11:0-0.
 Wilson, B., 1993. Australian Marine Shells. Prosobranch Gastropods. Odyssey Publishing, Kallaroo, WA
 Jansen, P., 1999 .The Australian Scissurellidae. Conchiglia, 31(291):47-55.
 Geiger D.L. (2012) Monograph of the little slit shells. Volume 1. Introduction, Scissurellidae. pp. 1-728. Volume 2. Anatomidae, Larocheidae, Depressizonidae, Sutilizonidae, Temnocinclidae. pp. 729–1291. Santa Barbara Museum of Natural History Monographs Number 7.

External links
 To Encyclopedia of Life
 To World Register of Marine Species

Anatomidae
Gastropods described in 1903